The Fitzgerald Bridge is a prestressed concrete bridge that carries Seaham Road across the Williams River from Raymond Terrace to Nelsons Plains in New South Wales, Australia.

History
In 1962, the Department of Main Roads commissioned MacDonald, Wagner & Priddle to design a bridge to replace a ferry service that operated from Raymond Terrace to Nelsons Plains, 40 metres upstream. Built by John Holland and named after former Member for Gloucester Ray Fitzgerald, it opened on 16 October 1965.

References

External links

Bridges completed in 1965
Concrete bridges in Australia
Road bridges in New South Wales
1965 establishments in Australia